Kyansit Min or King Kyan Sit is a 2005 Burmese history drama film directed by Lu Min.

Plot
The film follows a story of King Kyansittha of Bagan Dynasty.

Cast
Lu Min as Kyansittha
Nyunt Win as Anawrahta
Aung Khaing as Yamankan
Nyi Nanda as Saw Lu
Htet Htet Moe Oo as Queen Manisanda
May Than Nu as Apeyadana
Pan Phyu as Thanbula
Soe Myat Nandar as Khin Tan
Hlaing Phyu Phyu Htut as Princess Shwe Einthi
Wah Wah Win Shwe

References

External links
{https://web.archive.org/web/20070629191622/http://www.kyansittminmovie.com/ Kyan Sit Min Movie}
http://www.luminn.com/kyansitmin1.htm
https://web.archive.org/web/20110722173625/http://www.people.com.mm/article.cfm?id=1768&parent=1768&sec=10
https://web.archive.org/web/20071212065814/http://www.tmmh.com.my/mograt/kingkyansitt/reviews/myanmartimes12_224_016.html
https://web.archive.org/web/20070402144756/http://www.tmmh.com.my/mograt/kingkyansitt/reviews/images/new_light_of_myanmar.gif

2005 films
2000s Burmese-language films
2000s historical films
Burmese historical films
Films set in the 11th century
Films set in Myanmar